German submarine U-3506 was a Type XXI U-boat of Nazi Germany's Kriegsmarine during World War II. The Elektroboote submarine was laid down on 14 July 1944 at the Schichau-Werke yard at Danzig, launched on 28 August 1944, and commissioned on 16 October 1944 under the command of Kapitänleutnant Gerhard Thäter.

Design
Like all Type XXI U-boats, U-3506 had a displacement of  when at the surface and  while submerged. The submarine was powered by two MAN SE supercharged six-cylinder M6V40/46KBB diesel engines each providing , two Siemens-Schuckert GU365/30 double-acting electric motors each providing , and two Siemens-Schuckert silent running GV232/28 electric motors each providing .

U-3506 was fitted with six  torpedo tubes in the bow and four  C/30 anti-aircraft guns. She could carry twenty-three torpedoes or seventeen torpedoes and twelve mines. The complement was five officers and fifty-two men.

Service history
U-3506 undertook no war patrols, with no ships sunk or damaged, remaining as a training vessel for the duration of the war. The bunker has since been filled in with gravel, although even that did not initially deter many souvenir hunters who measured the position of open hatches and dug down to them to allow the removal of artifacts. The boat now lies beneath a car park and she and the other wrecks are completely inaccessible. The site is located in the Free Port of Hamburg and in order to access it one must present a passport.

References

Bibliography

External links
 

World War II submarines of Germany
Type XXI submarines
U-boats commissioned in 1944
U-boats scuttled in 1945
1944 ships
Ships built in Danzig
Ships built by Schichau